Damone Lamar Brown (born June 28, 1979) is an American former professional basketball player. He is  6'9" and 212 lb, and played the forward position. After playing college basketball at Syracuse University, he was selected by the Philadelphia 76ers in the second round of the 2001 NBA draft. Throughout his NBA career he played for the 76ers, the Toronto Raptors, the New Jersey Nets and the Washington Wizards while averaging 2.8 points and 1.3 rebounds per game in 39 career games. He played seven games with the Indiana Pacers in the 2005–06 preseason.

Brown's final NBA game was played on April 15, 2005 in a 119 - 111 win over the Cleveland Cavaliers where he recorded 2 points and 1 rebound in 3 minutes of playing time.

In 2007, Brown was a member of the NBA Development League's Sioux Falls Skyforce. In the 2008 D-League Expansion Draft Brown had his rights drafted by the Reno Bighorns.

On February 26, 2009, Brown was arrested in Reno, Nevada and charged with money laundering in connection with a cocaine ring operating in Buffalo, New York.

In 2010, Brown played for the Buffalo Stampede of the PBL (Premier Basketball League).

Coaching career

In 2015, Brown was hired an assistant coach at Villa Maria College in Buffalo, New York. After spending three seasons with the Vikings, Brown was hired as the head coach at Bryant & Stratton College of Buffalo to lead the first year program.  He led the Bobcats to a 17–12 record in their inaugural season and a trip to the United States Collegiate Athletic Association (USCAA) National Final Four.  This past season, Brown once again led the Bobcats to a trip to the national tournament, finishing the season 19–11 after the tournament was cut short to the COVID-19 pandemic.

Brown also continues to coach with the private coaching service, CoachUp, giving lessons in upstate New York.

References

External links
 
 NBA stats @ basketballreference.com
 

1979 births
Living people
African-American basketball players
American expatriate basketball people in Canada
American expatriate basketball people in Japan
American expatriate basketball people in Mexico
American expatriate basketball people in the Netherlands
American expatriate basketball people in South Korea
American expatriate basketball people in Venezuela
American men's basketball players
Basketball players from Buffalo, New York
Charleston Lowgators players
Heroes Den Bosch players
Guaros de Lara (basketball) players
Huntsville Flight players
New Jersey Nets players
Philadelphia 76ers draft picks
Philadelphia 76ers players
Reno Bighorns players
Seoul SK Knights players
Sioux Falls Skyforce players
Small forwards
Syracuse Orange men's basketball players
Toronto Raptors players
Washington Wizards players
21st-century African-American sportspeople
20th-century African-American sportspeople